Ortho R. Fairbanks (April 25, 1925 – June 2, 2015) was one of the many members of the Fairbanks family who have been prominent artists.

Fairbanks was the grandson of painter John B. Fairbanks and the grand-nephew of Avard Fairbanks. He was born in Salt Lake City and received a BFA from the University of Utah in 1952 taking classes from his Uncle Avard. He received his MFA in 1953 also from the University of Utah. He married Myrna on February 18, 1949, right before he left on a mission for the Church of Jesus Christ of Latter-day Saints to New Zealand. From 1960 to 1968 Fairbanks was a professor at the Church College of Hawaii. He contributed carvings to some of Avard Fairbanks's works. He also taught at the Northland Pioneer College.

In 1965, Fairbanks was in Italy doing a study of sculpture in Italy and was able to obtain a copy of Vincenzo Di Francesca's unique conversion story to the LDS Church, which he then gave to the Improvement Era, which was the first to print it. It was later adapted into the film How Rare a Possession by the LDS Church.

Fairbanks sculpted a monument to John Morgan and his commercial college, one of the first business schools in Utah.  He has also made a sculpture to remember young children who die.

The statue of Karl G. Maeser on Brigham Young University campus is by Fairbanks. Fairbanks's busts of Brigham Young, David O. McKay and Ezra Taft Benson are on display at the LDS Conference Center. He has also made sculptures of Hyrum Smith, Orson Pratt, and Philo T. Farnsworth.

Ortho Fairbanks sculpted a bust of the prophet Joseph Smith when he was studying in Italy. He had access to the death mask of Joseph for facial details. A copy is owned by the Church History Museum in Salt Lake City, Utah. A copy is also on display in the Harold B. Lee Library.

References

External links 

 Faculty files—Fairbanks, Ortho R., 1960–1969, L. Tom Perry Special Collections, Harold B. Lee Library, Brigham Young University

American Latter Day Saint artists
20th-century American sculptors
20th-century male artists
Brigham Young University–Hawaii faculty
University of Utah alumni
1925 births
2015 deaths
Artists from Salt Lake City
21st-century American sculptors
21st-century male artists
American male sculptors
Latter Day Saints from Hawaii
American expatriates in Italy
Sculptors from Utah
Harold B. Lee Library-related film articles